Zatrephes dichroma is a moth of the family Erebidae. It was described by Hervé de Toulgoët in 1989. It is found in Ecuador.

References

 

Phaegopterina
Moths described in 1989